Thomas Harry Cherones, Jr. (born September 11, 1939) is an American director and producer of several TV series. He is best known for his work on Seinfeld, where he directed 81 of the 86 episodes of the first five seasons. For his work directing the series, he won a Directors Guild of America Award, and a Primetime Emmy Award as producer.

Early life
Cherones was born and raised in Tuscaloosa, Alabama, where his father, Tom Cherones, Sr. operated a radio and TV repair shop. His grandfather was a Greek immigrant. His mother was Hazel Belle Hyche. He has a younger brother, Bill Cherones, who also worked in Hollywood.

Cherones graduated from the University of New Mexico in 1961 with a bachelor's degree in journalism and received a MA in Telecommunications from the University of Alabama in 1966. From 1961 to 1965, he was a lieutenant in the United States Navy.

Television career
Cherones began working in educational television while a student at the University of Alabama and later produced and directed programs for WQED in Pittsburgh. His first work after moving to Hollywood in 1975 was as a production manager for General Hospital.

Cherones began as a television director on My Sister Sam in the 1980s. In the 1990s, he directed and produced Seinfeld (81 episodes) and NewsRadio (56 episodes). His work on Seinfeld won him praise as well as an Emmy, a DGA Award and a Golden Globe Award. Cherones left Seinfeld after season five at Jerry Seinfeld's request: "He was tired of the same thing, I guess. We changed writers almost every season, and finally he just wanted somebody else, another presence, to try to keep it fresh," Cherones said. 

Cherones also worked on Welcome Back Kotter, Caroline in the City, Annie McGuire, and Ellen. Within Seinfeld, he appears in a cameo as the fictional director in "The Pilot".

In 2003, he was inducted into the Alabama Stage and Screen Hall of Fame. He was also inducted into the University of Alabama College of Communication and Information Sciences Hall of Fame in 2001.

Later life
From 2002 to 2014, Cherones taught a film production course at the University of Alabama in Tuscaloosa, where he had earned a Master's degree in 1976.

In 2012, Cherones published his first novel, The Hardly Boys, a parody of the old Hardy Boys books.

Personal life
Cherones has two children, Susan and Scott, from his first marriage. He moved to Hollywood in 1975 with his second wife, Joyce Keener, who died in 2006.

Cherones is married to photographer Carol E. Richards. They divide their time between Florence, Oregon; Taos, New Mexico; and Los Angeles, California.

References

External links
 
 

1939 births
American people of Greek descent
American television directors
21st-century American novelists
American parodists
Parody novelists
Living people
People from Tuscaloosa, Alabama
University of Alabama alumni
University of New Mexico alumni
Directors Guild of America Award winners
Primetime Emmy Award winners
People from Florence, Oregon
People from Taos, New Mexico
Television producers from Alabama
Television producers from Oregon
American male novelists